ABLOC CT is a Dutch UCI Continental cycling team founded in 2014. After 3 years of Parkhotel Valkenburg as the name-sponsor, the team switched to Monkey Town as their name-sponsor. In 2019, the team switched to the name Monkey Town - à Bloc as their name. In 2020, the team moved to ABLOC CT as their name.

Team history

2014
The team started under the name Parkhotel Valkenburg CT in 2014. At the Dutch National Road Race Championships the team was very prominent in chasing down the breakaway but the team was no match for the break who made itto the line. Best placed finisher was Jasper Ockeloen in 56th. The Team's best result for the 2014 season was third overall at the Tour de Taiwan with Marco Zanotti. The team achieved no victories this season.

Doping
During the 2017 Tour of Qinghai Lake, Antonio Santoro tested positive for Acetazolamide and was banned for six months.

Team roster

Major wins

2014
 Stage 3b Sibiu Cycling Tour, Marco Zanotti
2015
 Himmerland Rundt, Wim Stroetinga
 Olympia's Tour
Stages 1b, 3 & 5b, Wim Stroetinga
Stage 5a (ITT), Dion Beukeboom
Stage 6, Joris Blokker
 De Kustpijl, Marco Zanotti
 Stage 5 Tour of Taihu Lake, Marco Zanotti
2016
 Stage 3 Tour de Taiwan, Peter Schulting
 Stage 3 Tour of Iran (Azerbaijan), Derk Abel Beckeringh
 Prologue Okolo Slovenska, Dennis Bakker
 Stage 5 Ster ZLM Toer, Wim Stroetinga
 Stage 3 Kreiz Breizh Elites, Peter Schulting
2017
 Stage 8 Tour of Hainan, Marco Zanotti
2018
 Stage 2 Tour of Antalya, Wim Kleiman
 Himmerland Rundt, André Looij
 Grote Prijs Jean-Pierre Monseré, André Looij
 Turul Romaniei
Stages 1 & 4 , Peter Schulting
Stage 3, Jeen de Jong
 Tacx Pro Classic, Peter Schulting
 Stage 3 Tour of Fuzhou, Ivar Slik
2019
 Stage 2 Tour of Antalya, Bas van der Kooij
 Stage 2 Oberösterreich Rundfahrt, Alex Molenaar
 Prologue Sibiu Cycling Tour, Ivar Slik
 Stage 8 Tour of Qinghai Lake, Alex Molenaar
  Overall Tour of Romania, Alex Molenaar
Stage 1 , Ivar Slik
 De Kustpijl, Bas van der Kooij
 Stage 3 Tour of Fuzhou, Ivar Slik
2020
  National Road Race Championships, Stijn Daemen
2021
No recorded victories
2022
 Wim Hendriks Trofee, Tomas Kopecky
 Midden–Brabant Poort Omloop, Mārtiņš Pluto
 Stage 4 Dookoła Mazowsza, Jesper Rasch
 Puchar MON, Jesper Rasch

National and continental champions

2014
 Dutch National Beach Race Championships, Jasper Ockeloen
2016
  UEC European Beach Race Championships, Jasper Ockeloen
  Dutch National Mountain Bike Championships Marathon, Jasper Ockeloen
2017
  UEC European Beach Race Championships, Jasper Ockeloen
2018
  Dutch National Beach Race Championships, Jasper Ockeloen
  Latvian National Road Race Championships U23, Martin Pluto
2019
  UEC European Beach Race Championships, Ivar Slik
2020
  Dutch National Beach Race Championships, Ivar Slik
  Dutch National Road Race Championships U23, Stijn Daemen

References

External links

Cycling teams based in the Netherlands
Cycling teams established in 2014
UCI Continental Teams (Europe)